The Porsche 953 was a heavily modified variant of the 911, designed and built specifically to compete in the 1984 Paris–Dakar Rally. It was a short lived model, as it was replaced in 1985 by the 959. It is sometimes referred to as the 911 4x4, as it used the developmental, manually controlled four-wheel drive system that was intended to be used on the 959. Three of them were entered into the Paris-Dakar Rally, one taking overall first place.

References

External links
 Driving the Paris-Dakar Porsche 953 at Goodwood

953